Ahmadey Sheikh Mukhtar is a Somali politician. He is the Minister of Endowment and Religious Affairs of Somalia, having been appointed to the position on 12 January 2015 by Prime Minister Omar Abdirashid Ali Sharmarke.

References

Living people
Government ministers of Somalia
Year of birth missing (living people)